Pechishchi is the name of several rural localities in Russia:
Pechishchi, Ivanovo Oblast, a village in Gavrilovo-Posadsky District of Ivanovo Oblast
Pechishchi, Republic of Tatarstan, a selo in Verkhneuslonsky District of the Republic of Tatarstan